Fico is a surname. Notable people with the name include: 

 Delina Fico, Albanian civil society activist 
 Enrica Antonioni (born 1952), née Fico, Italian film director and actress, widow of Michelangelo Antonioni
 Raffaella Fico (born 1988), Italian showgirl, singer and model
 Rauf Fico (1881–1944), Albanian ambassador and politician
 Robert Fico (born 1964), former prime minister of Slovakia
 Roberto Fico (born 1974), President of the Italian Chamber of Deputies

See also 
 Fico (disambiguation)